The Opouawe River is a river of the Wairarapa, in the Wellington Region of New Zealand's North Island.

See also 
 List of rivers of New Zealand

References 

Rivers of the Wellington Region
Rivers of New Zealand